Dick Burke (born 23 December 1938) is  a former Australian rules footballer who played with South Melbourne in the Victorian Football League (VFL).

Notes

External links 
		

Living people
1938 births
Australian rules footballers from Victoria (Australia)
Sydney Swans players